Tired Lion are an Australian indie rock band formed in Perth in 2010. With a lineup consisting of singer/guitarist Sophie Hopes, lead guitarist Matt Tanner, bassist Nick Vasey, and drummer Ethan Darnell, the group released two EPs: All We Didn't Know in 2013 and Figurine in 2015. Rising to prominence with their single "I Don't Think You Like Me" from the latter EP, Tired Lion won the J Award for Unearthed Artist of 2015. They performed at Splendour in the Grass as a result, and continued to tour extensively, including at the Glastonbury Festival 2016. Their debut album, Dumb Days, was released in September 2017, produced by Violent Soho's Luke Boerdam.

History
Hopes and Tanner attended the same high school in Perth, initially performing acoustic folk music together, before branching out to songwriting, inspired by busking in Fremantle and listening to The Smashing Pumpkins' Siamese Dream. The addition of schoolmate Darnell on drums, and of a Boss DS-1 pedal, led the band's sound to develop. Early names for the group included The Love Band and Space Boy, until one of the band's initial bassists suggested Tired Lion. Vasey later joined as the band's bassist, completing the current lineup.

Tired Lion supported several acts on tour, such as Violent Soho, Gyroscope, Spiderbait, The 1975, British India, Kingswood, and Luca Brasi. Some of their numerous festival appearances include Homebake, Groovin' the Moo, Falls Festival, Southbound, Reading and Leeds Festivals, and Primavera Sound.

On Tuesday 6 March 2018, Guitarist Matt Tanner stated via Facebook that he would be parting ways with the band after having played guitar with them since their inception. Tanner cited "personal reasons" as his motivation behind the departure.

Members
Current members
 Sophie Hopes – lead vocals, guitar (2010–present)

Current touring musicians
 Antonia Hickey – bass, backing vocals (2019–present)
 Jay Clive – drums (2020–present)
 James Eyre Walker – lead guitar, backing vocals, sampler (2021–present)

Past members
 Matt Tanner – lead guitar, backing vocals (2010–2018)
 Ethan Darnell – drums (2010–2019)
 Nick Vasey – bass, backing vocals (2013–2019)

Past touring musicians

 Joel Martin – lead guitar (2018–2019)
 Luke Boerdram – lead guitar, backing vocals (2019)
 Michael Richards – drums (2019–2020)
 Tim Maxwell – lead guitar (2020)
 Michael Hardy – drums (2020)
 Caleb Anderson – lead guitar, backing vocals (2020–2021)

Discography

Studio albums

EPs

Singles

Music videos

Awards and nominations
J Awards

|-
| J Awards of 2015 || Tired Lion|| Unearthed Artist of the Year || 
|-

WAM Song of the Year

 (wins only)
|-
| 2014 || "I Don't Think You Like Me"|| Rock Song of the Year || 
|-

West Australian Music Industry Awards

|-
| 2014 || Tired Lion || Most Popular Live Act || 
|-
| rowspan="5"|2015 ||rowspan="2"|Tired Lion|| Best Rock Act || 
|-
| Most Popular Act || 
|-
| Figurine || Best EP || 
|-
| "I Don't Think You Like Me" || Best Single || 
|-
| Sophie Hopes || Best Female Vocalist || 
|-
| rowspan="6"|2016 ||rowspan="4"|Tired Lion|| Best Pop Act || 
|-
| Best Rock Act || 
|-
| Most Popular Act || 
|-
| Most Popular Live Act || 
|-
| rowspan="2"|"Not My Friends"|| Best Single || 
|-
| Most Popular Music Video ||

References

Musical groups from Perth, Western Australia
2010 establishments in Australia
Musical groups established in 2010
Australian indie rock groups
Dew Process artists